Katar River is a river of central Ethiopia. It arises from the glaciated slopes of Mount Kaka and Mount Badda in the Arsi Zone. The Katar's tributaries include the Gonde. The gradient of the river is generally steep, and areas suitable for irrigation are few in number and very limited in extent. With a watershed of 3,400 km2, the Katar drains into Lake Ziway.

See also
List of Ethiopian rivers

References

Rivers of Ethiopia